Lempira may refer to:

 Lempira (Lenca ruler) (died 1537), 16th century leader of the Lenca peoples of Central America, who led local resistance against the Spanish conquistadores
 Honduran lempira, unit of currency
 Puerto Lempira, the capital of the Honduran department of Gracias a Dios
 Lempira Department, the Honduran political division
 Lempira F.C., a Honduran football club